The following is a list of telenovelas produced by Televisa in the 2010s.

Years 

Notes

References 

Televisa 2010s
Mexican television-related lists
 2010s